My Pal/Task Force is a double-A sided single released by Violent Soho in 2009 on the Ecstatic Peace! label. The first track is a cover of Melbourne-based band God's 1988 single "My Pal". Darren Levin of Mess+Noise says that "the band stay remarkably true to the song’s acne-riddled genesis/genius." The second track is Violent Soho's cover of the 1978 song, Task Force, from Brisbane's Razar, which Levin described as "irreverent and off-the-cuff... like Rancid covering the Ramones."

Track listing

References 

Violent Soho songs
2009 singles